Flame of Love is the second Japanese extended play (third overall) by South Korean singer Taemin under EMI Records, a division of Universal Music Japan. It was released digitally on July 3, 2017, and physically on July 18, 2017. The title track was released on June 28, 2017. Taemin performed songs from the EP at his first solo concert in Japan at the Nippon Budokan in Tokyo, which attracted 28,000 fans. The visual contents were co-produced by Mika Ninagawa. A deluxe edition comes with a bonus DVD with a music video for the title song, its dance version, and shooting sketch for cover artwork and music video. After the release, the album immediately ranked number one on Japan's daily albums charts, selling more than 45,000 copies.

Track listing

Charts

Sales

References

Taemin EPs
2017 EPs
J-pop EPs